Albie Thoms (28 July 1941 – 28 November 2012) was an Australian film director, writer, and producer.  He was born in Sydney, Australia.  He was nominated for at the 1979 AFI Awards for Best Original Screenplay for Palm Beach. He is best known for his work with Ubu Films, the Sydney Filmmakers’ Co-operative, and the Yellow House.  He made a number of short films.

He died on 28 November 2012.

Books

As well as Polemics for a New Cinema (1978), Thoms wrote Surfmovies, (2000) a history of the Australian surfing film, published by Shore Thing, Noosa. His memoir ‘My Generation’ (2012) was published shortly after his death by Media21 publishing. He has also contributed to The Documentary Film in Australia publication as well as providing catalogue essays for Bohemians in the Bush (1991) and Belle-Ile: Monet, Russell and Matisse in Brittany (2001), both for AGNSW, and Then and Now and Everything in Between (2010), Mosman Art Gallery,

References

External links
 
Obituary: Champion of film as art pushed boundaries, in Sydney Morning Herald, 4 December 2012. Retrieved 11 June 2020

Australian film directors
1941 births
2012 deaths